Benny Díaz Jáuregui (born December 15, 1998) is an American professional soccer player who plays as a goalkeeper for El Paso Locomotive in the USL Championship, on loan from Liga MX club Tijuana.

Club career
Born in California in the United States, Díaz began his career with Cimarrones de Sonora before joining Liga MX club Querétaro. Prior to the 2020–21 season, Díaz signed with Tijuana. He made his professional debut for the club on April 3, 2021 against Atlas, coming on as a 60th minute substitute as Tijuana were defeated 1–0, the goal being scored prior to Díaz coming on.

On January 18, 2023, Díaz joined El Paso Locomotive on a loan deal through the 2023 USL Championship season.

Career statistics

Club

References

External links
 
 Profile at Club Tijuana

1998 births
Living people
American soccer players
Mexican footballers
Association football goalkeepers
Cimarrones de Sonora players
Querétaro F.C. footballers
Club Tijuana footballers
Liga MX players
Liga Premier de México players
Soccer players from California
American expatriate soccer players
Expatriate footballers in Mexico
American sportspeople of Mexican descent
Oakland Roots SC players
El Paso Locomotive FC players
USL Championship players